The GE Dash 8-40B (or B40-8) is a 4-axle diesel-electric locomotive built by GE Transportation Systems between 1988 and 1989.  It is part of the GE Dash 8 Series of freight locomotives.

A total of 151 examples of this locomotive were built for North American railroads.

The GE Dash 8-40BW (B40-8W) is a variant fitted with a full-width cab. Another variant is the GE Dash 8-40BP, more commonly known as the Genesis series. The locomotives in the Genesis series are the P40DC, the P42DC, and the P32AC-DM.

Original owners

Preservation
In July 2014, Union Pacific #1848, formerly St. Louis Southwestern #8049, was donated by the Union Pacific Railroad to the Illinois Railway Museum.

See also

List of GE locomotives

References 

 
 
 

Dash 8-40B
B-B locomotives
Diesel-electric locomotives of the United States
Railway locomotives introduced in 1988
Freight locomotives
Standard gauge locomotives of the United States